Suchland Islands is a group of about 8 small islands lying just inside the central part of the mouth of Cranton Bay. Mapped by United States Geological Survey (USGS) from surveys and U.S. Navy air photos, 1960–66. Named by Advisory Committee on Antarctic Names (US-ACAN) for Everett B. Suchland, Jr., U.S. Navy, radioman at Byrd Station, 1967.

See also 
 List of Antarctic and sub-Antarctic islands

Islands of Ellsworth Land